The State Police of Latvia (also Latvian State Police) is the national police service and one of the national law enforcement agencies of the Republic of Latvia. It is subordinate to the Ministry of the Interior. The agency is divided into five Regional Administrations (Riga, Kurzeme, Latgale, Vidzeme, Zemgale). Since the 13th of October 2020, the Chief of the State Police is Armands Ruks.

History 

The founding date of the Latvian Police is considered to be December 5th, 1918, when the transitional government of the newly-proclaimed Republic of Latvia, the People's Council of Latvia, approved the Temporary Regulations on the Internal Security Organization (Pagaidu noteikumi par iekšējās apsardzības organizēšanu), which regulated the structure of the police force and put it under jurisdiction of the Ministry of the Interior of Latvia, led by Miķelis Valters. The date is now commemorated in Latvia as the Day of the Police.

Due to the ongoing Latvian War of Independence and the lack of territory controlled by Latvian forces at that time, the force could only begin its activities in the summer of 1919 after the Latvian Army and its allies had liberated large parts of the country from the Red Army. Facing a lack of qualified personnel, the Police School at the Riga Prefecture was opened in the same year. 

After the war, the force was further divided into the Civil (Kārtības policija), Criminal (Kriminālpolicija) and Secret Police (Politiskā policija). Latvia became a member of Interpol in 1929. After the Soviet occupation of Latvia in 1940, the police force was dissolved and around 600 former servicemen and their relatives were persecuted. Under the Soviet regime law enforcement in the Latvian SSR was primarily the task of the Soviet Militsiya.

After the restoration of the independence of Latvia, the Latvian Police was re-established on 4 June 1991 with the approval of the law "On Police". One of its first units was the 1st Police (Patrol) Battalion, established on April 30th, 1991. The main task of the battalion, which was one of the first armed formations of the Latvian government, was to provide security of the Supreme Council of Latvia and strategically important buildings (government offices, radio and television broadcasting infrastructure). In 1992, the battalion was renamed as the Security Service of the Republic of Latvia, which was merged into the Military Police in 2010. Latvia re-joined Interpol on the 4th of November 1992.

Organization 

The agency is led by the Chief of the State Police, General Armands Ruks. The previous police chief Ints Ķuzis, incumbent since 2nd of August 2011, resigned on 20 February 2020 to run as a candidate for the 2020 Riga City Council election. Currently the organization employs 6371 personnel and receives €133 million annual funding.

Qualification for Service 

For a person to qualify for service at the State Police of Latvia, they must initially complete the 2.5 year full-time or 3 year part-time first  level professional higher education programme "State Police Junior Inspector" at the State Police College. There are 4 specializations available: investigator, public policeman, criminal policeman and crime expert. The candidate selection is based on a number of physical, cognitive, memory, communication and psychological tests. A candidate must be a Latvian citizen between 18 and 40 years of age with a secondary education certificate and not have committed any intentional crimes for a successful application. A number of further education programmes are available.

Structure 
The main large organizational units are as follows:

 Main Administration Unit
 Regional Units
 Courland Region Division
 Semigallia Region Division
 Latgale Region Division
 Vidzeme Region Division
 Riga Region Division
 Public Order Unit
 Coordination and Control Division
 Special Object Security Division
 Traffic Control Division
 Prevention Division
 Criminal Police Unit (supervises the Omega special operations unit)
 International Cooperation Division
 Organized Crime Division
 Economic Crime Division
 Criminal Intelligence Division
 Criminal Investigations Division
 Human Resources Unit
 Internal Control Office
 Special Matters Unit
 Secrecy Unit

OMEGA is the premier counter-terrorism and hostage response unit of Latvia, part of the State Police. Founded in 1992, OMEGA does cooperate with many other counter-terrorism units over the world. The Heckler & Koch MP5, the HK G36C and the Walther P99 weapons are used.

Ranks 

The Latvian police ranks are the same as in any of the agencies subordinate to the Ministry of the Interior. The General rank is assigned by the Cabinet of Ministers of the Republic of Latvia, while the Second Lieutenant, First Lieutenant, Captain, Major, Lieutenant Colonel and Colonel ranks are assigned by the Interior Minister.

Equipment and Vehicles 

While the precise weapons arsenal of the State Police of Latvia is not known, according to the weapons procurement of the Ministry of Interior, some of the weapons they use together with the State Secret Police and Border Guard are the following:

 9 mm PARA pistols and automatic pistols,
 Glock-17, Glock-19 and Glock-26 pistols,
 Heckler & Koch UMP, MP-5 submachine guns,
 Heckler & Koch G36 assault rifles,
 Accuracy International AXMC and Heckler & Koch G28 sniper rifles.

The State Police of Latvia in the last 5 years replaced most of its vehicles with the following:

 Renault Trafic and Renault Kangoo,
 Škoda Octavia and Škoda Superb,

 Opel Mokka and Opel Insignia,
 Volkswagen Amarok,
 Yamaha FJR1300,
 Subaru Forester,
 Citroen Jumpy,

Some of the Škoda vehicles used for traffic policing are unmarked.

Uniform and Vehicle Design 
In 1991, the Latvian State Police first adopted a grey-white vehicle livery, which was designed by Gunārs Glūdiņš, a former professor of the Art Academy of Latvia. The design took inspiration from American police and military vehicles, with the first iteration of the design also including stripes in red. A similar white-red version was adopted by the State Fire and Rescue Service, a green-white - by municipal police forces and an early grey-white - by the Security Service of Parliament and State President, as well as other services.  

In June 2018, while celebrating its 100th anniversary, the Police unveiled its new visual identity: a new, pre-WWII-style logo based on the lesser coat of arms of Latvia and new livery with blue, lime green and grey elements inspired by a Latvian folk ornament, the Brush of Māra (Māras Slotiņa). The new design was designed by a group of students and professors from the Art Academy of Latvia and is scheduled to replace the old one starting from 2020. New uniforms to gradually replace the old all-blue kit were also presented later the same year. The old uniforms are planned to be phased out by 1 July 2024.

See also
 Law enforcement in Latvia
 Latvian Military Police
 State Border Guard

References

External links
The Law on Police (Supreme Council of the Republic of Latvia, 1991, last amended March 2019)
 Official website in English

 

 
Law enforcement agencies of Latvia